See also Big band.

A
Alyn Ainsworth (BBC Northern Dance Orchestra)
John Arthy (Pasadena Roof Orchestra)
Bill Ashton (National Youth Jazz Orchestra)

B
Kenny Baker
Chris Barber
Ivy Benson
Tito Burns

C
Phil Collins (The Phil Collins Big Band)
Laurence Cottle (Laurence Cottle Big Band)
Ben Cottrell (Beats n Pieces Big Band)

D
Joe Daniels
John Dankworth
Chris Dean (Syd Lawrence Orchestra)
 Eric Delaney

E
Ray Ellington

F
Greg Francis (The New Squadronaires Orchestra)

G
Michael Garrick
Calum Gourlay

H
Tubby Hayes
Ted Heath
Jools Holland (Jools Holland's Rhythm and Blues Orchestra)

J
Jack Jackson
Laurie Johnson

K
Basil Kirchin
Chris Kaberry (Vermont Big Band)

L
Michael Lamb (The Strictly Smokin' Big Band) 
Syd Lawrence
Vic Lewis
Joe Loss
Don Lusher (The Don Lusher Big Band)

M
Ken Mackintosh

P
Jack Parnell
Harry Parry
Andy Prior

R
Nick Ross (NRO The Nick Ross Orchestra)
Edmundo Ros

S
Cyril Stapleton (BBC Show Band)

T
Billy Ternent
Stan Tracey

W
Don Weller
John Wilson (John Wilson Orchestra)
Eric Winstone

References